Sinocyclocheilus lateristriatus is a species of ray-finned fish in the genus Sinocyclocheilus.

References 

lateristriatus
Endemic fauna of China
Freshwater fish of China
Fish described in 1992